Jamestown is a village in Bienville Parish, Louisiana, United States. The population was 139 at the 2010 census and 130 in 2017.

Notable people

Harvey Locke Carey, Louisiana lawyer and politician, spent his later years in a camp on Kepler Lake.
Lee Smith, a retired professional baseball Hall of Fame pitcher, was born there in 1957.
Enoch T. Nix, a banker in Bossier City and a 30-year member of the Louisiana State Board of Education and its replacement body, the Board of Elementary and Secondary Education, was born in Jamestown in 1920.
Calvin Marion Robinson (1908-1957), a native of Jamestown, was the sheriff of Winn Parish, prior to 1956.

Geography
Jamestown is located in western Bienville Parish at  (32.341201, -93.208366).

Climate
This climatic region is typified by large seasonal temperature differences, with warm to hot (and often humid) summers and mild winters. According to the Köppen Climate Classification system, Jamestown has a humid subtropical climate, abbreviated "Cfa" on climate maps.

Demographics

As of the census of 2000, there were 149 people, 60 households, and 36 families residing in the village. The racial makeup of the village was 95.97% White, 3.36% African American and 0.67% Native American.

There were 60 households, out of which 26.7% had children under the age of 18 living with them, 48.3% were married couples living together, 6.7% had a female householder with no husband present, and 40.0% were non-families. 36.7% of all households were made up of individuals, and 16.7% had someone living alone who was 65 years of age or older. The average household size was 2.48 and the average family size was 3.33.

In the village, the population was spread out, with 26.8% under the age of 18, 8.7% from 18 to 24, 25.5% from 25 to 44, 22.1% from 45 to 64, and 16.8% who were 65 years of age or older. The median age was 37 years. For every 100 females, there were 75.3 males. For every 100 females age 18 and over, there were 81.7 males.

The median income for a household in the village was $23,125, and the median income for a family was $33,125. Males had a median income of $26,250 versus $21,875 for females. The per capita income for the village was $11,305. There were 6.9% of families and 9.1% of the population living below the poverty line, including no under eighteens and 33.3% of those over 64.

References

Villages in Bienville Parish, Louisiana
Villages in Louisiana